Glenbower Rovers GAA is a Gaelic Athletic Association club located in Killeagh, County Cork, Ireland. The club is concerned with the game of Gaelic football and is a sister club of Killeagh GAA.

Honours
East Cork Junior A Football Championship (3): 2012, 2013, 2014

Notable players

 Joe Deane
 Séamus Harnedy

References

Gaelic games clubs in County Cork
Gaelic football clubs in County Cork